Dumari & Spuget (‘The Judge and the Winos’) is the current and the longest lasting band of Finnish recording artist Tuomari Nurmio.

General
Dumari & Spuget usually performs with the same line up, but in the film Toivon tuolla puolen by Aki Kaurismäki guitar is played by Esa Pulliainen instead of the regular Miikka Paatelainen.

Line up

Standard line up 
 Tuomari Nurmio – vocals, guitar
 Miikka "MacGyver" Paatelainen – guitars, harmonica, backing vocals
 Markku Hillilä – drums, percussion
 Mitja Tuurala – double bass, organ

Dumari & Spuget & Blosarit
In addition to the above:
Juho Viljanen: trombone, tuba, percussion
Janne Toivonen: trumpet
Antti Hynninen: saxophone

Discography
The albums have been credited mainly to Tuomari Nurmio. However, the latest album, Usvaa putkeen, is credited to Dumari & Spuget.

References

Finnish rock music groups